TV Sakartvelo  is a Georgian television channel, launched on September 1, 2007.

References

External links
www.tvsakartvelo.ge

Television stations in Georgia (country)
Georgian-language television stations